Annie Souriau is a French seismologist from the commune of Saint-Cloud Paris. She is primarily known for her research into Earth's inner and outer cores, specifically her work examining seismic activity within and around the Pyrenees mountains. Through her and her colleague's research and studies, she has made notable advances to how we understand the inner workings of the earth's core while also winning countless awards in the process.

Education and career 
Annie Souriau began her Education at École normal supérieure de Fontenay-aux-Roses, which was reserved as a school for girls, during that time her specialty was physics. She then moved onto Institut de Physique du Globe in Paris where she obtained her Ph.D in 1978. in seismology on the structure of the upper mantle. After completing this Souriau then moved on to Toulouse in 1979 to work with the Geodesy Research Group, where alongside and led by Michel Lefebvre, they created a CNRS structure which was used to create a link between fundamental research and space experiments in Earth physics. She spent 1983 to 1984 at Harvard University, followed by a six-month period in Canberra. She was a senior scientist at CNRS in 2004(Centre national de la Recherche Scientifique).

Research 
Souriau is known for her combination of observational data and modeling to examine the structure of Earth's internal core, particularly within the Pyrenees mountains. She has also examined how earthquakes and the drift of the Earth's pole interact with the Chandler wobble, and the heterogeneous nature of the mantle and how it interacts with the surface topography of Earth.

Used a top-down and bottom-up approach to determine the changing rotation of the inner core. Samples of seismic waves were taken, when observed, it appears that the core did not have a cylindrical symmetry. The top-down approach showed that the inner core anisotropy reflects cylindrical symmetry. The axis of the inner core is not perpendicular to orbit, but rather tilted. The rotation affects the direction of anisotropy which results in a change in propagation times. The bottom-up approach first observed the differing anisotropy. The rotation is found to be affected by the changing anisotropy that occurs under seismic waves.

One of the questions that Annie was researching was whether or not there was an existing structure within the outer liquid core. The possible situation that could explain the presence of another structure are eigenmodes and the anisotropy that abnormally splits the eigenmodes. Souriau conducted her research predominantly looking at anisotropy and eigenmodes within the outer liquid. She looked for anisotropy within the outer liquid core by using data from PKPdf polar rays. After, she looked for heterogeneities that would lie still underneath the polar caps which are located at the core mantle boundary. The conclusion of her research was she could not find any splitting eigenmodes within the outer liquid core.

Through Annie's research she has looked at seismic phases by analyzing patters in travel times and how they reflect/traverse off the earth’s core. She has aided in discovering three important concepts concerning the Earth’s inner core over the last three decades. The first discovery is that the inner core is elastically anisotropic and has a symmetrical axis that is aligned with the rotational axis of earth. The second discovery is that there is hemispherical elastic heterogeneity in the earth’s inner core and lastly the solid mantle above, rotates slower than the earth’s inner core. Souriau predicted that the earth’s outer core was homogeneous and presented evidence that the base was heterogeneous and used that idea to investigate the connections between the heterogeneous mantle and the dynamics with the topography of the earth’s surface.  Due to Annie’s findings, she was the recipient of the 2019 EGU Gutenberg Medal.

Selected publications 
 
 

Annie Souriau, J. H. Woodhouse; A strategy for deploying a seismological network for global studies of Earth structure. Bulletin of the Seismological Society of America 1985;; 75 (4): 1179–1193. doi: https://doi.org/10.1785/BSSA0750041179
Spatial variations of b-value and crustal stress in the Pyrenees, A. Rigo &A. Souriau &M. Sylvander, (October 2017)
Deep Earth Structure: The Earth's Cores, A. Souriau, Marie Calvet (2015)
Séismicité de la bordure nord des Pyrénées centrales et occidentales: une conséquence de la subsidence de blocs denses exhumés dans la croûte supérieure, Annie Souriau, Alexis Rigo, Matthieu Sylvander, Sébastien Benahmed, Frank Grimaud  (2014)
Presumption of large-scale heterogeneity at the top of the outer core basal layer, Annie Souriau (2015)
Seismicity in central-western Pyrenees (France): A consequence of the subsidence of dense exhumed bodies, Annie Souriau , Alexis Rigo, Matthieu Sylvander, Sébastien Benahmed(2014)
Seismic attenuation in the eastern Australian and Antarctic plates, from multiple ScS waves, Annie Souriau, Luis Rivera, Alessia Maggi, Jean Jacques Lévêque (2012)
Ground motion simulations of a major historical earthquake (1660) in the French Pyrenees using recent moderate size earthquakes, L. Honore, Françoise Courboulex, Annie Souriau, (2011)
Multimethod Characterization of the French-Pyrenean Valley of Bagneres-de-Bigorre for Seismic-Hazard Evaluation: Observations and Models, Annie Souriau, Emmanuel Chaljub, Cécile Cornou, Ludovic Margerin, Marie Calvet, Julie Maury, Marc Wathelet, Franck Grimaud, Christian Ponsolles, Catherine Pequegnat, Mickaël Langlais, and Philippe Guéguen, (August 2011), doi: 10.1785/0120100293
Lopsided growth of Earth's inner core: a new interpretation for seismic hemispherical variations in the uppermost inner core (Invited), Marie Calvet, M.Monnereau, Ludovic Margerin, A. Souriau, (2010)
Seismological constraints on ice properties at Dome C, Antarctica, from horizontal to vertical spectral ratios, Jean-Jacques Lé, V Que, Alessia Maggi, Annie Souriau (2010) doi:10.1017/S0954102010000325
CASE-IPY: autonomous seismic stations newly deployed on the East Antarctic Plateau, Jean-Jacques Leveque, Alessia Maggi, Annie Souriau, Gerard Wittlinger (2010)
Commentary on the note Refutation of the sismo-acoustic hypothesis invoked by the double bang catastrophe in Toulouse (France) on 21 September 2001, Annie Souriau, Alexis Rigo, Matthieu Sylvander, 2009)
A Major Historical Earthquake in the French Pyrenees Revisited using Actual Moderate Size Earthquakes, Françoise Courboulex, L. Honore, A. Souriau (2010)

Awards and honors 
 Fellow, American Geophysical Union (2001)
Member, Academia Europaea (2004)
Beno Gutenberg Medal, European Geosciences Union (2019)
Inaugural winner of the  Réseau Accélérométrique Permanent (RAP) award (2018)
Prize Binoux of the French Academy of Sciences (1989)
Corresponding member of the Bureau des longitudes, Paris (2010)

References 

Fellows of the American Geophysical Union
Seismologists
Women geologists
French National Centre for Scientific Research scientists
1947 births
Living people